Paolo Andrés Alcocer Coca (born 3 September 2000), is a professional footballer who plays as a midfielder and defender for Club Atlético Palmaflor. Born in Germany, Alcocer is also eligible to represent the United States and Bolivia, the latter of which he has been capped at youth international level for.

Personal life
His grandfather, Máximo Alcócer, played for the Bolivia national football team.

Career statistics

Club

Notes

References

2000 births
Living people
Bolivian footballers
Association football midfielders
Bolivian Primera División players
Weston FC players
Guabirá players
Club Bolívar players
Club Aurora players